John Floyer (26 April 1811 – 4 July 1887) was an English cricketer with amateur status who was active from 1832 to 1833.  He was later a Conservative Party politician who sat in the House of Commons in two periods between 1846 and 1885.

Life
He was born in Stinsford, Dorset, the son of Rev. William Floyer and his wife Elizabeth Barton, daughton of Stephen Barton. He was a member of the old Floyer family of Floyer Hayes in Devon descended from Floherus (Flohère), the Exon Domesday Book tenant of that estate, a French knight who in 1086 held two estates in Devon. 

Floyer was educated at Winchester College. He matriculated in 1828 at Balliol College, Oxford, graduating B.A. in 1831. He appeared in first-class cricket for the University team in one match in 1832. He appeared in 1833 in one other match subsequently deemed to be first-class. He appeared in two matches as an unknown handedness batsman whose bowling style is unknown, playing for Oxford University and for an A to K team organised by Marylebone Cricket Club (MCC). He scored one run with a highest score of 1 and took no wickets.

Folyer was a Deputy Lieutenant and J.P. for Dorset, and was High Sheriff of Dorset in 1844. He was also major of the Queen's Own (Dorset) Yeoman Cavalry.

In 1846 Floyer was elected Member of Parliament for Dorset and held the seat until 1857. He was re-elected for Dorset in 1864 and held the seat until 1885. In that year, the county's three-member seat was subdivided. He died in Westminster.

Family
Floyer married in 1844 Georgina Charlotte Frances Bankes, daughter of George Bankes, MP for Corfe Castle.

Bibliography

References

External links
 

1811 births
1887 deaths
UK MPs 1880–1885
UK MPs 1841–1847
UK MPs 1847–1852
UK MPs 1852–1857
UK MPs 1859–1865
UK MPs 1865–1868
UK MPs 1868–1874
UK MPs 1874–1880
Deputy Lieutenants of Dorset
High Sheriffs of Dorset
People educated at Winchester College
Alumni of Balliol College, Oxford
Conservative Party (UK) MPs for English constituencies
English cricketers
English cricketers of 1826 to 1863
Oxford University cricketers
A to K v L to Z cricketers